When the Circus Came to Town is a 1981 American made-for-television drama film directed by Boris Sagal and starring Elizabeth Montgomery, Christopher Plummer, and Eileen Brennan. It originally aired on CBS as a "Movie of the Week" on January 20, 1981.

Story
When the Circus Came to Town chronicles the life of Mary Flynn (Montgomery), a woman nearing middle age living in a small town. When the circus comes through town, she realizes nothing will ever change unless she does something different, so she leaves her boring sheltered life to run away and join the circus. While adapting to her new life, she finds herself challenged, and in the end, happy with her new life.

Cast
 Elizabeth Montgomery . . . Mary Flynn
 Christopher Plummer . . . Duke Royal
 Eileen Brennan . . . Jessy
 Gretchen Wyler . . . Olivia Probaska
Anne Shropshire . . . Aunt Helen
Tommy Madden . . . Louie
Timothy Hill . . . Schuller
Russell Saunders . . . Ivan Probashka
Mark Yerkes . . . Sergei Probashka
Bob Yerkes . . . Georgi Probashka
J. Don Ferguson . . . Andre Probashka
 Anne Haney . . . Blossom
George Ellis . . . Rodriguez
Don Devendorf . . . Motel Clerk
Charles Lawlor . . . Redneck
Nicholas Warf . . . Juggler

Production notes

Crew
Directed by: Boris Sagal
Second Assistant Director: Stephen A. Glanzrock
Written by: Larry Grusin
Executive Producer: Barry Krost
Producer: Robert Halmi, Sr.
Associate Producer: Robert Halmi, Jr.
Original Music: Charles Gross
Orchestrator: Gary Anderson
Cinematography: Michel Hugo
Film Editor: Murray Solomon
Production Design: Robert Gundlach
Choreographer: Marge Champion Sagal
Dialogue Coach: Marge Champion Sagal

External links
 

1981 drama films
1981 television films
1981 films
American drama films
1980s English-language films
Circus films
CBS network films
Films directed by Boris Sagal
1980s American films